Oliver Gene Lake, Jr. (born January 12, 1966 in St. Louis) is an American jazz drummer. He is the son of saxophonist Oliver Lake.

Lake began playing drums when he was five years old, and took lessons with Pheeroan akLaff as a high schooler at The High School of Music & Art in New York City. He attended Berklee College of Music, where he worked with Tommy Campbell, and played in local Boston bands in a variety of styles. He played with his father in New York in 1987 and 1988, then joined Henry Threadgill's ensemble in 1990. Later in the 1990s he worked with Steve Coleman, Lunar Crush (with David Fiuczynski and John Medeski), Marcus Miller, Brandon Ross, David Sanborn, the World Saxophone Quartet, and Joe Zawinul. Outside of jazz, Lake also played with R&B musicians such as Maxwell and Me'Shell Ndegeocello.

Lake has been a resident of Montclair, New Jersey.

Discography

With Henry Threadgill
Carry the Day (Columbia, 1995)

References

1966 births
Living people
American jazz drummers
Musicians from St. Louis
People from Montclair, New Jersey
20th-century American drummers
American male drummers
Jazz musicians from Missouri
20th-century American male musicians
American male jazz musicians
People from Fort Greene, Brooklyn
Jazz musicians from New York (state)